Norma Holzmann Farber (6 August 1909 – 21 March 1984) was an American children's book writer and poet.  The Poetry Society of America presents the Norma Farber First Book Award, which is awarded for a first book of original poetry written by an American.

Life
She was born in Boston in 1909, daughter of G. Augustus and Augusta Schon Holzman.  She attended Girls' Latin School.  She earned degrees from Wellesley College, and Radcliffe College.

On 3 July 1928, she married Sidney Farber, (died 1973) the founder of the Children's Cancer Research Foundation (now the Dana–Farber Cancer Institute) in Boston.  According to her obituary published in the New York Times, she was also a classical soprano. Farber was sister-in-law to noted philosopher Marvin Farber, faculty at the University at Buffalo.

Farber authored six books of poems and 18 children's books. Her poetry was first published in the 1940s, and she was still active in writing until her death from vascular disease in 1984. She was survived by four children.

Awards
 Belgium's Premier Prix in singing in 1936
 Golden Rose Award
 As I Was Crossing Boston Common, was nominated for a National Book Award in 1975

Works

Poetry

Juvenile poetry

Juvenile fiction
  first printing 1973

Anthology

References

1909 births
1984 deaths
American children's writers
20th-century American poets
Wellesley College alumni
Radcliffe College alumni
Writers from Boston
American women poets
American women children's writers
20th-century American women writers